The 1997–98 Maltese Premier League was the 18th season of the Maltese Premier League, and the 83rd season of top-tier football in Malta. Ten teams competed in the league, and Valletta F.C. won the championship.

League standings

Results

Matches 1–18

Matches 19–27

References
Malta - List of final tables (RSSSF)

Maltese Premier League seasons
Malta
1997–98 in Maltese football